Newsholme is a small village and civil parish in the Ribble Valley, Lancashire, England, but lies within the historic West Riding of Yorkshire. According to the 2001 census, the parish had a population of 50, however the United Kingdom Census 2011 grouped the parish with Horton and Paythorne (2001 pop. 76 and 95), giving a total of 253.

The parish adjoins the Ribble Valley parishes of Paythorne and Horton, and the parish of Hellifield in the Craven district of North Yorkshire.

In the west of the parish, on high ground overlooking the River Ribble, are the remains of a late Anglo-Saxon or early Norman Ringwork castle, called Castle Haugh but also known locally as Cromwell's Basin.
On the eastern side of the village, next to Demesne Farm is the site of a Medieval Manorial Hall called the Old Hall.

Between 1872 and 1957 the village had a railway station on the Ribble Valley Line.

Newsholme was once a township in the ancient parish of Gisburn, in the Staincliffe Wapentake of the West Riding of Yorkshire. This became a civil parish in 1866, forming part of the Bowland Rural District from 1894 to 1974. It has since become part of the Lancashire borough of Ribble Valley.

Along with Rimington, Gisburn, Middop, Gisburn Forest, Paythorne  and Horton, the parish forms the Gisburn, Rimington ward of Ribble Valley Borough Council.

The Pennine Bridleway National Trail and Ribble Way pass through the parish, crossing the Ribble on the Paythorne Bridge.

Media gallery

See also

Listed buildings in Newsholme, Lancashire
Scheduled monuments in Lancashire

References 

Geography of Ribble Valley
Villages in Lancashire
Civil parishes in Lancashire